Mohammed Obeid Al-Salhi (born May 11, 1986) is a Saudi middle distance runner who specializes in the 800 metres.

Running career
He won the gold medal at the 2003 World Youth Championships. He then competed at the 2003 World Championships, the 2004 Olympic Games and the 2005 World Championships without reaching the final.

He then finished fourth at the 2005 Asian Championships, eighth at the 2007 World Championships and fifth at the 2007 World Athletics Final. He took the silver medal in the 800 m behind Abubaker Kaki, as well as the 4 × 400 m relay gold, at the 2007 Pan Arab Games in Cairo. On May 8, 2009, he ran his personal best time in the 800 metres in a time of 1:43.66 minutes, achieved in Doha.

References

External links
 

1986 births
Living people
Saudi Arabian male middle-distance runners
Athletes (track and field) at the 2004 Summer Olympics
Athletes (track and field) at the 2008 Summer Olympics
Olympic athletes of Saudi Arabia
Place of birth missing (living people)
Asian Games medalists in athletics (track and field)
Athletes (track and field) at the 2002 Asian Games
Athletes (track and field) at the 2006 Asian Games
Athletes (track and field) at the 2010 Asian Games
Asian Games gold medalists for Saudi Arabia
Medalists at the 2002 Asian Games
Medalists at the 2006 Asian Games
Medalists at the 2010 Asian Games